Polina Leykina was the defending champion, but chose to participate in Saint-Malo instead.

Natalia Vikhlyantseva won the title, defeating Donna Vekić in the final, 6–1, 6–2.

Seeds

Main draw

Finals

Top half

Bottom half

References 
 Main draw

Neva Cup - Singles